Viborg HK (Viborg Håndbold Klub) is a Danish handball club from Viborg. The club has many teams for both women and men, but especially the professional women's team is one of the most successful in Danish and European handball since the beginning of the 1990s. This team currently competes in the women's Danish Women's Handball League.

The women's team have won a total of 14 Danish Championships (all-time record), ten Danish Cup Championships (ranking second in all-time Cup trophies behind FIF), three Women's EHF Cup Championships (all-time record), and three EHF Women's Champions League Championships (ranking fifth in all-time Champions League trophies). They are also two-time winners of the now cancelled tournament EHF Champions Trophy and one-time winner of the EHF Women's Cup Winners' Cup.

They won the EHF Women's Champions League in the 2009/2010 season and won the second time in a row. They also held the title in the 2005–2006 season.

They have a local rivalry with fellow Midtjylland team Ikast Håndbold.

History

The club was established in 1936, but it was not until 1989 the women's team was promoted to the best league in Denmark. Manager of the team at that time was a young Ulrik Wilbek, who later became national manager for Denmark and was extremely successful here as well. Among the players at the time of the promotion was Anja Andersen and goalkeeper Susanne Munk Lauritsen.

Since the promotion, Viborg HK has had overwhelming success with 13 National Championships from 1994–2010 and only twice ended below third place in the league. By winning their 13th National Championship 22 May 2010, they became the club with most won Danish Championships in the women's league ever, taking the record from former title holder FIF with 12 Danish Championships. They are now tied with H.G. Handball in the men's league as the club with most won National Championships in Danish handball history. Viborg Handball Club is also one of only three teams to have won the national championship four consecutive times. The other two being GOG and Frederiksberg IF.

Adding to the amazing list of records, Viborg HK is the only team in the women's league besides Slagelse DT to finish the season with all the matches won in their National League – 22 matches (Season 2008/2009), and the only team to win 28 times in a row.

In European tournaments, the team has reached the finals several times and won a lot of titles, the greatest of them being the EHF Women's Champions League, which they won in 2006, 2009 and 2010. They are as of 2010, the most successful Danish Handball club and the fourth most successful handball club in EHF Women's Champions League with 3 gold medals and 2 silver medals, ranking behind RK Radnicki Belgrade with 3 gold medals and 4 silver medals, Hypo Niederösterreich with 8 gold medals and 5 silver medals, and finally Spartak Kyiv with a total of 13 gold medals and 2 silver medals.

They are as of 2010, currently the most winning women's team in Women's EHF Cup history, with three titles.

The 30 May 2009, became the biggest triumph for the Danish women's team. Not only did Viborg HK win their 12th National Championship, they also became the first Danish handball team, both on the men's and women's side to win all three major titles ("The Treble") in the same season. The Danish Women's Handball Cup, The EHF Women's Champions League and the Danish Championship.

However, in the 2010/2011 season, Viborg had to win with an excess of 9 goals against Dinamo Volgograd to advance from the mainround. They won with 7 goals, meaning that Viborg wouldn't be able to defend their EHF Women's Champions League title.

The men's team has not been quite as successful. It was only in 1999 a promotion to the best league was reached. Since then, the best result has been a second place in 2007.

Kits

Results
Danish Championship:
Gold: 1994, 1995, 1996, 1997, 1999, 2000, 2001, 2002, 2004, 2006, 2008, 2009, 2010, 2014
Silver: 1991, 1993, 1998, 2005, 2007, 2021
Bronze: 2011, 2018, 2020
Danish Cup:
Winner: 1993, 1994, 1996, 2003, 2007, 2008, 2009, 2010, 2011, 2013, 2014
Champions League:
Winner: 2006, 2009, 2010
Finalist: 1997, 2001
EHF Cup:
Winner: 1994, 1999, 2004
Finalist: 2022
Cup Winners' Cup:
Winner: 2014
Finalist: 2012
EHF Champions Trophy:
Winner: 2000/01, 2005/06

Team

Current squad
Squad for the 2022–23 season

Goalkeepers
 1  Mathilde Juncker
 12  Ida Marie Kaysen
Wingers
LW 
 13  Laura Holm
 22  Lærke Nolsøe (pregnant)
 25  Maria Stokholm (c) 
RW
 23  Thilde Frandsen
 26  Emilie Hovden
Pivots
 15  Karen Klokker
 19  Sara Hald
 31  Ida-Marie Dahl
 
Back players
LB
 21  Signe Vetter Laursen 
 24  Charité Mumbongo
CB 
 11  Melissa Petrén (pregnant)
 14  Tonje Enkerud
 18  Christina Pedersen
RB
 6  Moa Högdahl
 9  Mathilde Rivas Toft

Retired numbers

Transfers
Transfers for the season 2023–24

 Joining	
  Ole Bitsch (Coach) (from  Randers HK)
  Ida Marie Kaysen (GK) (from  Gudme HK, with immediate effect)
  Camilla Degn (LW) (from  Randers HK)
  Laura Borg Thestrup (LB) (from  Skanderborg Håndbold)
  Marielle Martinsen (CB) (from  Aarhus United)
  Jana Mittún (CB) (from  H71 Torshavn)
  Louise Søndergaard (RB) (from  Bjerringbro FH)
  Julie Holm (RB) (from  Ringkøbing Håndbold)
  Alberte Simonsen (P) (from  Ringkøbing Håndbold)

 Leaving
  Jakob Vestergaard (Coach) (to  SG BBM Bietigheim)
  Anna Kristensen (GK) (to  Team Esbjerg, with immediate effect)
  Laura Holm (LW) (to  Skanderborg Håndbold)
  Kerstin Kündig (CB) (to  SG BBM Bietigheim, with immediate effect)
  Tonje Enkerud (CB) (to  Storhamar HE)
  Melissa Petrén (CB)
  Mathilde Rivas Toft (RB) (to  Storhamar HE)
  Moa Högdahl (RB) (to  Nykøbing Falster Håndboldklub) ?
  Emilie Hovden (RW) (to  Győri Audi ETO KC)
  Ida-Marie Dahl (P) (to  CS Gloria Bistrița-Năsăud)

Technical staff

 Head Coach: Jakob Vestergaard
 Assistant coach: Susanne Munk Wilbek
 Team Leader: Liss Kristensen
 Physiotherapist: Morten Vanggaard Nielsen

Notable former players

 Anja Andersen (1988-1990)
 Rikke Skov (1994-2016)
 Henriette Mikkelsen (2003-2012, 2013-2015)
 Heidi Astrup (1989-1997, 1999-2003, 2005-2007, 2009-2010, 2015-2016)
 Karen Brødsgaard (1998-2003)
 Louise Bager Due (2001-2012, 2016-2017)
 Katrine Fruelund (1999-2005)
 Anette Hoffmann (1990-1997)
 Lotte Kiærskou (2001-2005) 
 Janne Kolling (1991-1997)
 Mette Klit (1991-1996, 1998-2000)
 Ann Grete Nørgaard (2000-2006, 2008-2009, 2015-2019)
 Gitte Aaen (2006-2010)
 Susanne Munk Lauritsen (1986-2001) 
 Christina Roslyng (1997-2003, 2007-2008)
 Anne Dorthe Tanderup (1992-1998)
 Helle Simonsen (1997-2001)
 Berit Kristensen (1999-2004)
 Louise Burgaard (2013-2015)
 Simone Böhme (2015-2017)
 Anne Cecilie de la Cour (2009-2013)
 Maria Fisker (2006-2009, 2011-2015)
 Mette Gravholt (2014-2015)
 Pernille Holst Holmsgaard (2011-2013)
 Christina Pedersen (2010-2012)
 Louise Pedersen (2001-2003)
 Louise Lyksborg (2012-2016)
 Jane Schumacher (2006-2008)
 Sille Thomsen (2014-2016)
 Josephine Touray (1997-1999)
 Trine Troelsen (2003-2007)
 Julie Aagaard (2011-2012)
 Sarah Paulsen (2013-2017)
 Lene Lund Høy Karlsen (2005-2010)
 Kristina Bille (2004-2007)
 Mie Sørensen (2016-2017)
 Rikke Poulsen (2014-2019)
 Line Uno (2015-2019)
 Stine Bodholt Nielsen (2016-2019)
 Line Haugsted (2016-2022)
 Kristina Jørgensen (2017-2022)
 Bojana Popović (2007-2010)
 Maja Savić (2010-2011)
 Heidi Tjugum (1997-2003)
 Tonje Larsen (1998-1999) 
 Camilla Thorsen (2000-2005)
 Anne Kjersti Suvdal (2013-2014)
 Katrine Lunde (2007-2010)
 Kristine Lunde-Borgersen (2007-2010)
 Ida Bjørndalen Karlsson (2007-2009)
 Amanda Kurtović (2012-2014)
 Marit Malm Frafjord (2010-2014)
 Siri Seglem (2015-2017)
 Chao Zhai (2004-2011)
 Valérie Nicolas (2003-2007) 
 Cléopâtre Darleux (2012-2014)
 Marie-Paule Gnabouyou (2015-2017)
 Cristina Vărzaru (2005-2012)
 Carmen Amariei (2010-2011)
 Linnea Torstenson (2013-2014)
 Johanna Ahlm (2009-2013)
 Cecilia Grubbström (2012-2013)
 Isabelle Gulldén (2011-2015)
 Hanna Daglund (2017-2019)
 Grit Jurack (2004-2012)
 Nora Reiche (2007-2010)
 Anja Althaus (2007-2012)
 Olga Assink (2003-2007, 2009-2010)
 Natasja Burgers (2002-2004)
 Maura Visser (2014-2015)
 Sanne van Olphen (2017-2018)
 Anita Bulath (2012-2013)
 Mónika Kovacsicz (2008-2010)
 Barbara Bognár (2015-2016)
 Rita Borók (2000-2002)
 Helga Németh (2003-2004)
 Gorica Aćimović (2009-2011)
 Mouna Chebbah (2010-2014)
 Sanja Damnjanović (2013-2015)
 Chana Masson (2013-2015)
 Isabel Ortuño (2004-2007)
 Natalya Deryugina (1995-2003)

Coaching history
 Lars Friis-Hansen (1995–1998)
 Ryan Zinglersen (2004–2005)
 Tomas Ryde (2005–2008)
 Jakob Vestergaard (2008–2011; 2018–)
 Martin Albertsen (2002–2004; 2011–2012)
 Oskar Bjarni Oskarsson (2012–2013)
 Christian Dalmose (2013–2015)
 Allan Heine (2015–2018)
 Ulrik Wilbek (1988–1991; 1998–2002)
 Mette Klit (2011)
 Heidi Astrup

Previous squads 

Squad for the 2020–21 season

Goalkeepers
 1  Emma Friberg
 12  Anna Kristensen
Wingers
LW 
 9  Laura Holm
 14  Amalie Grøn Hansen
 25  Maria Stokholm
RW
 7  Stine Andersen
 18  Sanne Beck Hansen
 23  Thilde Frandsen
Line players
 13  Madeleine Östlund
 21  Majbritt Toft Hansen 
 31  Ida-Marie Dahl  
 
Back players
LB
 10  Kristina Jørgensen
 11  Line Haugsted
 54  Marianne Haugsted
CB
 4  Laura Damgaard  
 8  Carin Strömberg (c) 
RB
 6  Moa Högdahl
 22  Pauline Bøgelund 

Squad for the 2019–20 season

Goalkeepers
 12  Anna Kristensen
 24  Josephine Nordstrøm Olsen
Wingers
LW 
 14  Amalie Grøn Hansen
 25  Maria Stokholm
RW
 7  Stine Andersen
 62  Anne Sofie Filtenborg
Line players
 13  Madeleine Östlund
 21  Majbritt Toft Hansen 
 31  Ida-Marie Dahl  
 
Back players
LB
 10  Kristina Jørgensen
 11  Line Haugsted
CB
 4  Laura Damgaard  
 8  Carin Strömberg (c) 
RB
 6  Moa Högdahl
 22  Pauline Bøgelund 

Squad for the 2018–19 season

Goalkeepers
 1  Hanna Daglund
 12  Rikke Poulsen
 24  Josephine Nordstrøm Olsen
Wingers
 14  Amalie Grøn Hansen
 23  Ann Grete Nørgaard Østerballe
RW
 7  Stine Andersen
 62  Anne Sofie Filtenborg
Line players
 9  Stine Bodholt Nielsen
 31  Ida-Marie Dahl
 43  Anne Hykkelbjerg

LB
 10  Kristina Jørgensen
 11  Line Haugsted
 97  Marianne Haugsted
CB
 8  Carin Strömberg (c)
 93  Line Uno
RB
 6  Moa Högdahl
 22  Pauline Bøgelund

Squad for the 2017–18 season

Goalkeepers
  Hanna Daglund
  Rikke Poulsen
  Josephine Nordstrøm Olsen
Wingers
LW 
  Ann Grete Nørgaard Østerballe
  Marie Høgh-Poulsen
  Amalie Grøn Hansen
RW
  Nataša Nolevska
  Anne Sofie Filtenborg
Line players
  Stine Bodholt Nielsen
  Mathilde Storgaard
  Anne Hykkelbjerg
  Signe Hald
 
Back players
LB
  Line Haugsted
  Kristina Jørgensen
  Clara Høgh-Poulsen
CB
  Line Uno
  Carin Strömberg
RB
  Nikoline Lundgreen
  Sidsel Bodholt Nielsen
  Sanne van Olphen

Squad for the 2016–17 season

Goalkeepers
  Rikke Poulsen
  Signe Brun
  Josephine Nordstrøm Olsen
  Mie Sørensen
Wingers
LW 
  Ann Grete Nørgaard Østerballe
  Karen Nørgaard Østerballe
  Amalie Grøn Hansen
RW
  Simone Böhme
Line players
  Stine Bodholt Nielsen
  Mathilde Storgaard
 
Back players
LB
  Rikke Skov
  Line Haugsted
  Clara Høgh-Poulsen
CB
  Siri Seglem
  Line Uno
  Carin Strömberg
RB
  Nikoline Lundgreen
  Sidsel Bodholt Nielsen
  Marie-Paule Gnabouyou

Squad for the 2015–16 season

Goalkeepers
  Rikke Poulsen
  Signe Brun
  Benedicte Thomassen
Wingers
LW 
  Ann Grete Nørgaard Østerballe
RW
  Simone Böhme
  Louise Lyksborg
  Ditte Kelså
Line players
  Kirsten Balle
  Sille Thomsen
  Mathilde Storgaard
 
Back players
LB
  Rikke Skov
  Sarah Paulsen
CB
  Siri Seglem
  Line Uno
  Barbara Bognár
RB
  Nikoline Lundgreen
  Sidsel Bodholt Nielsen
  Marie-Paule Gnabouyou

Squad for the 2014–15 season

Goalkeepers
  Rikke Poulsen
  Chana Masson
Wingers
LW 
  Sarah Andreasen
  Henriette Mikkelsen
  Maria Fisker
RW
  Louise Lyksborg
Line players
  Kirsten Balle
  Sille Thomsen
  Mette Gravholt
  Cecilie Dalmose
 
Back players
LB
  Rikke Skov
  Mette Thyrsted
  Sanja Damnjanović
CB
  Isabelle Gulldén
  Maura Visser
  Sarah Paulsen
RB
  Nikoline Lundgreen
  Louise Burgaard

Squad for the 2013–14 season

Goalkeepers
  Cléopâtre Darleux
  Chana Masson
Wingers
LW 
  Anne Kjersti Suvdal
  Henriette Mikkelsen
  Maria Fisker
RW
  Louise Lyksborg
Line players
  Kristina Flognman
  Sabine Pedersen
  Marit Malm Frafjord
 
Back players
LB
  Linnea Torstenson
  Rikke Skov
  Mette Thyrsted
  Sanja Damnjanović
CB
  Isabelle Gulldén
  Mouna Chebbah
  Sarah Paulsen
RB
  Amanda Kurtović
  Louise Burgaard

Squad for the 2012–13 season

Goalkeepers
  Cléopâtre Darleux
  Cecilia Grubbström
  Søs Søby
Wingers
LW 
  Holly Lam-Moores
  Maria Fisker
RW
  Johanne Andersen
  Louise Lyksborg
Line players
  Sabine Pedersen
  Marit Malm Frafjord
 
Back players
LB
  Pernille Larsen
  Rikke Skov
  Anita Bulath
  Emily Baunsgaard
CB
  Johanna Ahlm
  Isabelle Gulldén
  Mouna Chebbah
RB
  Amanda Kurtović
  Louise Burgaard

Squad for the 2011–12 season

Goalkeepers
  Christina Pedersen
  Louise Bager Due
Wingers
LW 
  Henriette Mikkelsen
  Maria Fisker
RW
  Cristina Varzaru
  Camilla Mikkelsen
Line players
  Anja Althaus
  Mathilde Kristensen
  Marit Malm Frafjord
 
Back players
LB
  Pernille Larsen
  Rikke Skov
  Emily Baunsgaard
CB
  Johanna Ahlm
  Caroline Müller
  Isabelle Gulldén
  Mouna Chebbah
RB
  Grit Jurack 
  Julie Aagaard
  Anne Cecilie de la Cour

Squad for the 2010–11 season

Goalkeepers
  Christina Pedersen
  Louise Bager Due
  Maja Torp
  Eva Brix
Wingers
LW 
  Maja Savić
  Henriette Mikkelsen
RW
  Cristina Varzaru
  Camilla Mikkelsen
  Katja Lausen-Marcher
Line players
  Anja Althaus
  Mathilde Kristensen
  Marit Malm Frafjord
 
Back players
LB
  Carmen Amariei
  Rikke Skov
  Pia Hildebrand
  Line Thorius
CB
  Johanna Ahlm
  Gorica Aćimović
  Chao Zhai
  Mouna Chebbah
RB
  Grit Jurack 

Squad for the 2009–10 season

Goalkeepers
  Katrine Lunde
  Katarina Bralo
  Maja Torp
  Sandra Mittet
Wingers
LW 
  Gitte Aaen
  Henriette Mikkelsen
RW
  Cristina Varzaru
  Mónika Kovacsicz
Line players
  Anja Althaus
  Lene Lund Nielsen
  Dianne Møller
  Olga Assink
  Karen Smidt
 
Back players
LB
  Bojana Popović
  Rikke Skov
  Kristine Lunde
CB
  Johanna Ahlm
  Gorica Aćimović
  Chao Zhai
RB
  Grit Jurack 
  Nora Reiche

Squad for the 2008–09 season

Goalkeepers
  Katrine Lunde
  Louise Bager Nørgaard
  Maja Torp
Wingers
LW 
  Ann Grete Nørgaard Østerballe
  Gitte Aaen
  Henriette Mikkelsen
  Maria Fisker
RW
  Cristina Varzaru
  Mónika Kovacsicz
  Camilla Mikkelsen
Line players
  Anja Althaus
  Lene Lund Nielsen
  Karen Smidt
 
Back players
LB
  Bojana Popović
  Kristine Lunde
CB
  Rikke Skov
  Chao Zhai
RB
  Grit Jurack 
  Ida Bjørndalen
  Nora Reiche
  Kamilla Haagensen

Squad for the 2007–08 season

Goalkeepers
  Katrine Lunde
  Louise Bager Nørgaard
  Marianne Lundsby
  Aurélie Rouqette
Wingers
LW 
  Christina Roslyng
  Gitte Aaen
  Henriette Mikkelsen
  Maria Fisker
RW
  Cristina Varzaru
  Lina Rask
  Camilla Mikkelsen
Line players
  Anja Althaus
  Stina Eriksen
  Stine Bodholt Nielsen
 
Back players
LB
  Bojana Popović
  Lene Thomsen
  Kristine Lunde
  Sidsel Bodholt Nielsen
CB
  Rikke Skov
  Jane Schumacher
RB
  Grit Jurack 
  Ida Bjørndalen
  Nora Reiche

Squad for the 2006–07 season

Goalkeepers
  Marie Staun
  Louise Bager Nørgaard 
  Valérie Nicolas
Wingers
LW 
  Gitte Aaen
  Henriette Mikkelsen
RW
  Cristina Varzaru
  Kristina Bille
  Lina Rask
Line players
  Stine Bodholt Nielsen
  Stina Eriksen
  Charlotte Højfeldt
  Lene Lund Nielsen
 
Back players
LB
  Isabel Ortuño
  Rikke Skov
  Lene Thomsen
CB
  Heidi Astrup
  Chao Zhai
  Trine Troelsen
  Jane Schumacher
RB
  Grit Jurack 

Squad for the 2005–06 season

Goalkeepers
  Marie Staun
  Louise Bager Nørgaard 
  Valérie Nicolas
Wingers
LW 
  Ann Grete Nørgaard Østerballe
  Sanne Bak Pedersen
  Henriette Mikkelsen
RW
  Cristina Varzaru
  Kristina Bille
Line players
  Olga Assink
  Charlotte Højfeldt
  Lene Lund Nielsen
 
Back players
LB
  Isabel Ortuño
  Rikke Skov
  Lene Thomsen
CB
  Heidi Astrup
  Chao Zhai
  Trine Troelsen
RB
  Grit Jurack 

Squad for the 2004–05 season

Goalkeepers
  Louise Bager Nørgaard 
  Valérie Nicolas
Wingers
LW 
  Camilla Thorsen
  Ann Grete Nørgaard Østerballe
  Sanne Bak Pedersen
  Henriette Mikkelsen
RW
  Saskia Mulder
  Kristina Bille
Line players
  Olga Assink
  Signe Grummedal
  Charlotte Højfeldt
  Camilla Søndergaard
 
Back players
LB
  Katrine Fruelund
  Rikke Skov
  Isabel Ortuño
CB
  Lotte Kiærskou
  Chao Zhai
  Trine Troelsen
RB
  Grit Jurack 

Squad for the 2003–04 season

Goalkeepers
  Louise Bager Nørgaard 
  Valérie Nicolas
Wingers
LW 
  Camilla Thorsen
  Ann Grete Nørgaard Østerballe
  Sanne Bak Pedersen
  Henriette Mikkelsen
RW
  Saskia Mulder
  Mari-Ann Laursen
  Silje Mari Berget
Line players
  Karen Brødsgaard
  Charlotte Højfeldt
  Camilla Søndergaard
 
Back players
LB
  Katrine Fruelund
  Rikke Skov
  Leila Duchemann
CB
  Lotte Kiærskou
  Berit Kristensen
  Trine Troelsen
RB
  Helga Németh 
  Natasja Burgers

Stadium 

Name: Vibocold Arena Viborg
City: Viborg
Capacity: 3,000
Address: Tingvej 5, 8800 Viborg

Kit manufacturers
 Salming Sports

References

External links

Official website

Danish handball clubs
handball club
Handball clubs established in 1936
1936 establishments in Denmark